Julian Reister was the defending champion.
Daniel Gimeno-Traver won the final after defeating Albert Montañés 6–2, 4–6, 6–4 in the final.

Seeds

Draw

Finals

Top half

Bottom half

References
 Main draw
 Qualifying draw

Internazionali di Monza e Brianza - Singles
2012 Singles